For other places named Saint-Bruno in Quebec, see Saint Bruno (disambiguation).

Saint-Bruno is a municipality in Quebec, located within the regional county municipality of Lac-Saint-Jean-Est.

The municipality had a population of 2,636 as of the Canada 2011 Census.

Economy

Bombardier Transportation has a minor engineering facility located in Saint-Bruno.

See also
 List of municipalities in Quebec

References

Municipalities in Quebec
Incorporated places in Saguenay–Lac-Saint-Jean